The Hertfordshire presidents' Trophy is an annual rugby union knock-out club competition organised by the Hertfordshire Rugby Football Union.  It was first introduced during the 1999–00 season, with the inaugural winners being Datchworth.  It is the third most important rugby union cup competition in Hertfordshire, behind the Hertfordshire presidents' Cup and Hertfordshire presidents' Tankard. 

The presidents' Trophy is currently open to the first teams of club sides based in Hertfordshire that play in tier 9 (Herts/Middlesex 1) and tier 10 (Herts/Middlesex 2) of the English rugby union league system.  The format is a knockout cup with a first round, semi-finals and a final to be held at Allianz Park (Saracen's home ground) in April–May, on the same date and same venue as the Cup and Tankard finals.

Hertfordshire presidents' Trophy winners

Number of wins
Verulamians (5)
Royston (3)
Tring (3)
Hemel Hempstead (2)
Old Ashmolean (2)
Datchworth (1)
Hitchin (1)
Stevenage Town (1)
Watford (1)

See also
 Hertfordshire RFU
 Hertfordshire presidents' Cup
 Hertfordshire presidents' Tankard
 English rugby union system
 Rugby union in England

References

External links
 Hertfordshire RFU

Recurring sporting events established in 1999
1999 establishments in England
Rugby union cup competitions in England
Rugby union in Hertfordshire